A mechanical organ is an organ that is self-playing, rather than played by a musician. For example, the barrel organ is activated either by a person turning a crank, or by clockwork driven by weights or springs.

Usually, mechanical organs are pipe organs although some instruments were built using reeds similar to those found in a harmonium. Since the 1950s, some instruments have been built using electronics to generate the sound, though still operated by mechanical or pneumatic means. From the 1990s pipe organs have been built that are operated by MIDI rather than the earlier mechanical means.

Originally, the music for mechanical organs was stored by pins on a large barrel.  Such instruments were called barrel organs. Such organs only have a very limited repertoire, both in the number of musical selections that could be stored, and the length of tune that could be accommodated.

In the 1890s, book music was invented.  This meant that the length of music was no longer constrained. Being physically much smaller than a barrel for a similar instrument, it is much easier to manipulate the music, and so a greater variety of music could be played.

Rather than the book music, some instruments are operated by a music roll.

In popular culture
In the movie The Great Race (1965) Professor Fate, with bandaged thumbs, is shown pretending to play a mechanical organ.

References

See also
Barrel piano
Barrel organ
Componium
Dance organ
Fairground organ
Musical clock
Musical box
Orchestrion
Organ grinder
Piano roll
Player piano
Reproducing piano
Serinette
Street organ

Pipe organ
Mechanical musical instruments
French inventions
French musical instruments